490th may refer to:

490th Bombardment Group, inactive United States Army Air Force unit
490th Fighter Squadron or 119th Fighter Squadron, flies the F-16C Fighting Falcon
490th Missile Squadron (490 MS), part of the 341st Missile Wing based at Malmstrom Air Force Base, Montana

See also
490 (number)
490, the year 490 (CDXC) of the Julian calendar
490 BC